Pure, released 16 September 1991, is the third solo album by former Ultravox frontman Midge Ure. It was the first release by Ure with a new record label BMG-Arista. The first single "Cold Cold Heart" reached number 17 on the UK Singles Chart in August 1991. "I See Hope in the Morning Light" and "Let It Go?" were also released as singles. The album has a blend of ethnic rhythms and clean album-oriented rock pop, pervaded by catchy hooks.

Background

It took Midge Ure two years to hammer together the material for Pure, both at his home studio in London and in the basement in his house on the Caribbean island of Montserrat, once he cleared away the damage wrought by the passing of Hurricane Hugo.

The album opens with "I See Hope in the Morning Light", a mixture of African rhythms and a gospel choir coupled with Uilliean pipes played by Paddy Moloney. 

"I See Hope in the Morning Light'", was written about the possible release of Nelson Mandela, and recorded as a celebration. Ure said: "I hit a block and didn't finish the song until way after his release. That's the way it happens sometimes."

The song "Tumbling Down" was inspired by the fall of the Berlin Wall 1989.

Midge Ure filmed the promo-videos to "Cold, Cold Heart" and "I See Hope" in Los Angeles.

Midge explained 1991:

"Let it Go?" question the idea of personal responsibility in the face of the worlds mountain of problems. Midge explained 1991:

Track listing

All tracks are written by Ure except 1 & 8 : Ure/Danny Mitchell, 6 & 10: Ure/Mitchell/Katherine Stephenson

Personnel
Midge Ure - Vocals, guitars, keyboards
Bass – Jeremy Meehan (tracks: 1, 3, 4, 6 to 10), Steve Brzezicki (tracks: 1, 2, 5, 10, 11)
Drums – Mark Brzezicki (tracks: 1, 3, 7 to 9, 11), Simon Phillips (tracks: 5, 6, 10)
Keyboards – Robbie Kilgore (tracks: 1, 3, 6 to 11)
Percussion – Steve Williams (tracks: 4, 7, 8)
Uilleann pipes and Tin Whistle - Paddy Moloney (track 1)
Background vocals (track 1) - Chris Ballin, Gwen Dupree, Michael McCloud, Phil Gannon, Ricci P. Washington, Sheylah Cuffy, Sylvia Mason-James, Vicki St James
Background vocals (track 5) - Angie Brown, Jackie Sheridan, Kate Stephenson, Sheylah Cuffy
Background vocals (track 10) - Jackie Sheridan, Kate Stephenson
Co-producer and engineer – Rik Walton
Design, Illustration – Una Fagan

References

External links 
AllMusic

1991 albums
Midge Ure albums
Albums produced by Midge Ure